William Fuller Maitland (1813–1876) was an English picture collector.

Life
Born 10 March 1813 in Mayfair, he was the second, but eldest surviving, son and heir of Ebenezer Fuller Maitland of Stansted, Essex and Shinfield Park in Berkshire, later of Park Place, also in Berkshire. He grew up at all three, as well as in Marylebone. He was educated by private tutors until he went to Trinity College, Cambridge, graduating B.A. in 1835, and M.A. in 1839.

During journeys to Italy Maitland encountered the works of early Italian masters. Their paintings formed the basis of a major part of his collection, anticipating later interest in Sandro Botticelli and others. English landscape painting was also largely represented. From the time of his first marriage in 1842 until his death, he lived at Stansted.

Maitland died suddenly at Stansted on 15 February 1876, and was buried there on 19 February.

Legacy
Maitland contributed to the Old Masters' Exhibitions of the Royal Academy, lending pictures over many years. After his death the bulk of his collection was exhibited at the South Kensington Museum; and subsequently nine of the major pictures were sold to the National Gallery, London.

Family
Fuller in 1842 married Lydia, only daughter of Lieutenant-colonel Serjentson Prescott, in Florence. They had four children. By his second wife, Charlotte Elizabeth Dick, daughter of James Munro Macnabb, whom he married in 1852, he had an only daughter.

Notes

 
Attribution
 

 

1813 births
1876 deaths
English art collectors
People from Stansted Mountfitchet
People from Shinfield
People from Remenham
People from Marylebone
William